Savithiri is a 1980 Tamil language drama film directed by Bharathan. A remake of his Malayalam film Prayanam, Savithiri marked his debut in Tamil cinema. The cast includes Vinoth, Menaka, J. V. Ramana Murthi, Manorama, Nanditha Bose and Master Suresh. The screenplay was written by Padmarajan who also scripted the original film. The music was composed by M. S. Viswanathan with lyrics by Kannadasan. The film was a commercial failure. The film became controversial upon release for the depiction of its principal characters who belong to the Brahmin community. This led to widespread protests by members of the community in Madras.

Cast
Vinoth
Menaka
J. V. Ramanamurthi
Nanditha Bose
Nithya

Soundtrack
Soundtrack was composed by M. S. Viswanathan.
Vazhndhal Unnodu - Vani Jayaram
Mazhalai Kaalamum - Vani Jayaram, P. Jayachandran
Kanni Iravin - MS Viswanathan
Manmadhan Baanathai - L. R. Eswari, Malaysia Vasudevan

References

External links
 

1980s Tamil-language films
1980 films
Films with screenplays by Padmarajan
Films about adultery in India
Tamil remakes of Malayalam films
Films directed by Bharathan
Films scored by M. S. Viswanathan